Coyote Hills  may refer to:
 Coyote Hills (Alameda County), California, USA
 Coyote Hills Regional Park
 Coyote Hills, Orange County, California, consists of:
 East Coyote Hills, Orange County, California, USA
 West Coyote Hills, Orange County, California, USA
 Coyote Hills (Plumas County), California, USA
 Coyote Hills, Baker County, Oregon, USA

See also
 Coyote Mountains, California, USA
 Coyote Mountains (Arizona), USA